Araeosoma leptaleum is a species of sea urchin of the family Echinothuriidae. Their armour is covered with spines. It is placed in the genus Araeosoma and lives in the sea. Araeosoma leptaleum was first scientifically described in 1909 by Alexander Emanuel Agassiz & Hubert Lyman Clark.

See also 
 Araeosoma eurypatum
 Araeosoma fenestratum
 Araeosoma owstoni

References 

leptaleum
Animals described in 1909
Taxa named by Hubert Lyman Clark